Domenico Contestabile (11 August 1937 – 28 October 2022) was an Italian lawyer and politician. A member of Forza Italia, he served in the Senate of the Republic from 1994 to 2006.

Contestabile died on 28 October 2022, at the age of 85.

References

1937 births
2022 deaths
20th-century Italian lawyers
Italian Socialist Party politicians
Forza Italia politicians
Members of the Italian Senate from Lombardy
Politicians of Campania
Senators of Legislature XII of Italy
Senators of Legislature XIII of Italy
Senators of Legislature XIV of Italy
People from the Province of Caserta